Six Frigates: The Epic History of the Founding of the U.S. Navy is a book by Ian W. Toll, which was published by Norton in 2006. The book is a history of the original six frigates of the U.S. Navy.

Awards
It was the 2007 recipient of the Samuel Eliot Morison Award for Naval Literature.

It received the Colby Award in 2007.

References

2006 non-fiction books
Books about the Age of Sail
Sailing frigates of the United States Navy
United States Navy in the 18th century
Non-fiction books about the United States Navy